Linus Sundström (born 28 October 1990 in Avesta, Sweden) is a former international speedway rider from Sweden.

Career 
Sundström's British speedway career started in 2009 with Rye House Rockets and he top scored for them during 2010 while also earning ten rides for Ipswich Witches in the higher division. In 2011, he signed for Peterborough Panthers for the 2011 Elite League speedway season. He stayed with them until 2013.

He was selected in the Swedish National squad for the 2012 & 2013 Speedway World Cups.

He achieved his greatest feat at the 2015 Speedway World Cup, when part of the Swedish team that became world team champions. In the World Cup Final he scored 4 points; the team consisted of Andreas Jonsson, Fredrik Lindgren and Antonio Lindbäck.

In 2018, Sundström returned to British speedway after signing for Poole Pirates for the SGB Premiership 2018 season but was replaced mid-season.

On 22 September 2019 he suffered what was described as a horrifying crash in Gdansk. He fractured his left thigh in two places, broke his upper arm and shoulder joint and tore his liver. After recovering from the injury he signed for Västervik Speedway but then in May 2021 suffered another serious crash while riding in the Danish league. He suffered seven broken or cracked vertebrae and made the decision to retire from racing.

Major results

World individual Championship
2010 Speedway Grand Prix - 31st
2011 Speedway Grand Prix - nc
2012 Speedway Grand Prix - 33rd
2013 Speedway Grand Prix - 22nd
2017 Speedway Grand Prix - 32nd

World team Championships
2015 Speedway World Cup - Winner
2017 Speedway World Cup - 2nd

European Championship 
 Individual U-19 European Championship
 2007 - Częstochowa - 14th place (3 pts)
 2008 - 9th place in Semi-Final 2
 2009 - Tarnów - 8th place (7 pts)
 Team U-19 European Championship
 2008 Rawicz - European Champion (6 pts)
 2009 - Holsted - Runner-up (5 pts)

See also 
 Sweden national speedway team

References

External links 

1990 births
Living people
Swedish speedway riders
Ipswich Witches riders
Peterborough Panthers riders
Poole Pirates riders
Rye House Rockets riders